Jason R. Moore is a Jamaican-American actor based in Los Angeles, California.

Career
Jason Moore was born in Kingston, Jamaica, but grew up in Albany, New York. He moved to New York City after graduating college, and soon after acquired roles on television series such as Law & Order: Special Victims Unit, Kings and The Unusuals. Moore secured a small role in his first movie The Sorcerer's Apprentice, followed by Killjoy Goes to Hell, and other short films. After moving to Los Angeles, Moore was later cast as Curtis Hoyle for Marvel series The Punisher.

Filmography

References

External links

21st-century American male actors
American male film actors
American male television actors
Living people
Male actors from Los Angeles
Male actors from New York City
Year of birth missing (living people)
People from Kingston, Jamaica